Bob Ormsby (born May 20, 1963 in Contra Costa County, California) is an American former alpine skier who competed in the 1988 Winter Olympics.

External links
 sports-reference.com
 

1963 births
Living people
American male alpine skiers
Olympic alpine skiers of the United States
Alpine skiers at the 1988 Winter Olympics
People from Contra Costa County, California
Sportspeople from California
People from Olympic Valley, California